Simon Mayer may be an alternate spelling of:

 Simon Marius (1573–1624), German astronomer
 Johann Simon Mayr (1763-1845), German composer